Tolumonas lignilytica is a Gram-negative, non-spore-forming and mesophilic bacterium from the genus of Tolumonas which has been isolated from tropical rainforest soil.

References

Aeromonadales
Bacteria described in 2015